Maria Schneider may refer to:
 Maria Schneider (politician) (born 1923), East German politician
 Maria Schneider (actress) (1952–2011), French actress
 Maria Schneider (musician) (born 1960), American musician and composer
 Maria Schneider (cartoonist) (born 1968), American cartoonist and illustrator
 Maria "Dish" Schneider, a fictional character from the M*A*S*H franchise